Travis Smith (born February 26, 1970) is an American graphic artist best known for designing heavy metal album art. He has been called "renowned" by Alternative Press and "unquestionably one of the most talented graphic artists in metal today" by Chronicles of Chaos. Smith has done work for many established rock and metal bands, including Death, Devin Townsend, Katatonia, Nevermore, Opeth, Anathema, CKY, Soilwork, King Diamond, Novembre, Avenged Sevenfold, Strapping Young Lad, Persefone, Riverside and Overkill.

History
Travis Smith was born on February 26, 1970, just outside San Diego, California. Growing up, Smith had no formal art education aside from a semester in high school. He got his start designing album covers for his friend's band, progressive metal group Psychotic Waltz. As of 2005, Smith has worked with nearly 100 bands. He currently resides in San Diego. When asked what his favorite artwork is at the time, Smith has responded: "Devin Townsend's Terria, Opeth's Blackwater Park,  and Katatonia's Last Fair Deal Gone Down."

Art
Smith's work base primarily consists of album art for metal bands. Smith is known for a "dark and introspective" style that is largely photography-based, digitally composed with various other media. For example, in creating his art for Avenged Sevenfold's Nightmare (2010), Smith "did a few actual painted textures with acrylics and watercolor, scanned them, and blended them with the whole picture." For some specific parts, like the skull and the girl, Smith "would digitally paint over photos and blend them into their originals."

List of works

References

Additional references

 Tagmatarhis, Alekos; Tsakonas, Giannis (January 16, 2005). "Interview – Travis Smith." Metal Perspective.

External links
 Seempieces, Smith's studio

1970 births
Living people
Artists from San Diego
Album-cover and concert-poster artists